The 1977 LPGA Championship was the 23rd LPGA Championship, played June 9–12, 1977 at the Gold Course of Bay Tree Golf Plantation in North Myrtle Beach, South Carolina.

Chako Higuchi won her only major title, three strokes ahead of runners-up Pat Bradley, Sandra Post, and Judy Rankin.

The purse was nearly tripled this year to $150,000, up from $55,000 in 1976.

It was the first golf major to be held in South Carolina. The Bay Tree Golf Plantation courses were closed and abandoned in 2006. Since then, the Senior PGA Championship (2007), PGA Championship (2012, 2021), and the U.S. Women's Open (2019) have been held or are scheduled to be conducted in the state, with all four in the Charleston market.

Past champions in the field

Made the cut

Source:

Missed the cut

Source:

Final leaderboard
Sunday, June 12, 1977

Source:

References

External links
Golf Observer leaderboard

Women's PGA Championship
Golf in South Carolina
LPGA Championship
LPGA Championship
LPGA Championship
LPGA Championship
Women's sports in South Carolina